Hartmut Walravens (born 1944) is a German librarian.  He was the director of the International ISBN Agency ?-2006 and the International ISMN Agency ?-2006.  He is presently Chairman of the International ISMN Agency 2006–present.

References

1944 births
Living people
German librarians